Eugene Borisovich Dynkin (11 May 1924 – 14 November 2014) was a Soviet and American mathematician.  He made contributions to the fields of probability and algebra, especially semisimple Lie groups, Lie algebras, and Markov processes. The Dynkin diagram, the Dynkin system, and Dynkin's lemma are named after him.

Biography 
Dynkin was born into a Jewish family, living in Leningrad until 1935, when his family was exiled to Kazakhstan. Two years later, when Dynkin was 13, his father disappeared in the Gulag.

Moscow University
At the age of 16, in 1940, Dynkin was admitted to Moscow University. He avoided military service in World War II because of his poor eyesight, and received his MS in 1945 and his PhD in 1948. He became an assistant professor at Moscow, but was not awarded a "chair" until 1954 because of his political undesirability. His academic progress was made difficult due to his father's fate, as well as Dynkin's Jewish origin; the special efforts of Andrey Kolmogorov, his PhD supervisor, made it possible for Dynkin to progress through graduate school into a teaching position.

USSR Academy of Sciences
In 1968, Dynkin was forced to transfer from the Moscow University to the Central Economic Mathematical Institute of the USSR Academy of Sciences.  He worked there on the theory of economic growth and economic equilibrium.

Cornell
He remained at the Institute until 1976, when he emigrated to the United States.  In 1977, he became a professor at Cornell University.

Death
Dynkin died at the Cayuga Medical Center in Ithaca, New York, aged 90.  Dynkin was an atheist.

Mathematical work

Dynkin is considered to be a rare example of a mathematician who made fundamental contributions to two very distinct areas of mathematics: algebra and probability theory. The algebraic period of Dynkin's mathematical work was between 1944 and 1954, though even during this time a probabilistic theme was noticeable. Indeed, Dynkin's first publication was in 1945, jointly with N. A. Dmitriev, solved a problem on the eigenvalues of stochastic matrices. This problem was raised at Kolmogorov's seminar on Markov chains, while both Dynkin and Dmitriev were undergraduates.

Lie Theory
While Dynkin was a student at Moscow University, he attended Israel Gelfand's seminar on Lie groups. In 1944, Gelfand asked him to prepare a survey on the structure and classification of semisimple Lie groups, based on the papers by Hermann Weyl and Bartel Leendert van der Waerden. Dynkin found the papers difficult to read, and in an attempt to better understand the results, he invented the notion of a "simple root" in a root system. He represented the pairwise angles between these simple roots in the form of a Dynkin diagram. In this way he obtained a cleaner exposition of the classification of complex semisimple Lie algebras. Of Dynkin's 1947 paper "Structure of semisimple Lie algebras", Bertram Kostant wrote: 

Dynkin's 1952 influential paper "Semisimple subalgebras of semisimple Lie algebras", contained large tables and lists, and studied the subalgebras of the exceptional Lie algebras.

Probability theory
Dynkin is considered one of the founders of the modern theory of Markov processes. The results obtained by Dynkin and other participants of his seminar at Moscow University were summarized in two books. The first of these, "Theory of Markov Processes", was published in 1959, and laid the foundations of the theory.

Dynkin's one-hour talk at the 1962 International Congress of Mathematicians in Stockholm, was delivered by Kolmogorov, since prior to his emigration, Dynkin was never permitted to travel to the West.  This talk was titled "Markov processes and problems in analysis".

Prizes and awards
Prize of the Moscow Mathematical Society, 1951
Institute of Mathematical Statistics, Fellow, 1962
American Academy of Arts and Sciences, Fellow, 1978
National Academy of Sciences of the USA, Member, 1985
American Mathematical Society, Leroy P. Steele Prize for Total Mathematical Work, 1993
Moscow Mathematical Society, Honorary Member, 1995
Doctor Honoris Causa of the Pierre and Marie Curie University (Paris 6), 1997
Doctor of Science (honoris causa) of the University of Warwick, 2003.
Doctor Honoris Causa of the Independent Moscow University (Russia), 2003
Fellow of the American Mathematical Society, 2012

Publications

See also
Algebra
Affine Dynkin diagram
Coxeter–Dynkin diagram
Dynkin index
Dynkin–Specht–Wever Lemma

Probability
Dynkin's formula
Dynkin system

Notes

External links

Department listing at Cornell University
Personal web page
Genealogy Tree of Dynkin's School
Collection of interviews assembled by Dynkin

1924 births
2014 deaths
Jewish American atheists
Fellows of the American Mathematical Society
Members of the United States National Academy of Sciences
20th-century Russian mathematicians
20th-century American mathematicians
21st-century American mathematicians
Soviet mathematicians
Cornell University faculty
Russian atheists
Russian Jews
Mathematicians from Saint Petersburg
Algebraists
Probability theorists
Soviet emigrants to the United States
Moscow State University alumni
People from Saint Petersburg
Measure theorists